Beltrán Vélez Ladrón de Guevara, 1st Marquis of Monreale (Sardinia) and 1st Marquis of Campo Real (Spain) (died 21 February 1652) was a Spanish political figure.

He was the son of Iñigo Vélez de Guevara and Catalina de Guevara, 5th Countess of Oñate. He married Catalina Vélez, 9th Countess of Oñate, daughter of his brother Íñigo Vélez de Guevara, 8th Count of Oñate.

He was a member of the State Council of Philip IV of Spain and Viceroy of Sardinia between 1651 and 1652. His son was Íñigo Vélez de Guevara, 10th Count of Oñate who married on 12 August 1666 Claire Louise de Ligne, daughter of Claude Lamoral, Prince of Ligne.

1652 deaths
Viceroys of Sardinia
Marquesses of Spain
Beltran 01
Spanish diplomats
Year of birth unknown